This is a list of National Monuments in Colombia.

Amazonas

Mirití-Paraná
 Cahuinarí National Park

Leticia
 Amacayacu National Park

Antioquia

Abejorral
 Historical center of Abejorral

Amagá

Amagá (Camilo Restrepo)
 Camilo Restrepo railway station

Amagá (Piedecuesta)
 Piedecuesta railway station

Angelópolis
 Angelópolis railway station

Barbosa
 Barbosa railway station

Barbosa (El Hatillo)
 El Hatillo railway station

Barbosa (Isaza)
 Isaza railway station

Barbosa (Popalito)
 Popalito railway station

Bello

Caldas
 Caldas railway station

Caracolí
 Caracolí railway station
 F. Gómez railway station

Cisneros
 Cisneros railway station

Cisneros (El Limón)
 El Limón railway station

Concepción
 Central sector

Copacabana
 Copacabana railway station

Don Matías
 House where Luis López de Mesa was born, located on the principal plaza of Bolívar and Páez streets

Envigado

Fredonia
 Fredonia station
 Jonas station

Fredonia (Los Palomos)
 Palomos station

Frontino – Urrao – Abriaquí
 Las Orquídeas National Natural Park

Girardota
 Girardota station

Guarne
 Santa Ana Chapel and its plazoleta. Conjunto urbano de la chapel de Santa Ana y la plazoleta con las construcciones que la enmarcan

Itagüí
 Itagüí railway station

Jardín
 Principal Park, declared a national monument in 1985
 Basilica of the Immaculate Conception, declared a national monument in 1980

Jericó

La Ceja
 Chapel of Our Lady of Chiquinquirá

La Estrella
 Ancon station

La Estrella (la tablaza)
 Estación del ferrocarril La Tablaza

Marinilla

 Historical center. Urban center of Marinilla. Sector histórico sin delimitar. Decreto 264 del 12-ii-1963 (declara)

Medellín

Medellín (Santa Elena)
 Zona arqueológica de Piedras Blancas. Cuenca alta de la quebrada Piedras Blancas. Altos del Rosario. Laguna camino de cieza matasanos

Medellín – Santo Domingo – Santiago – Cisneros – El Limón
 Túnel de la quiebra

Montebello

 Chapel de Nuestra Señora de la Candelaria, corregimiento de Sabaletas

Puerto Berrío
 Estación de Los Monos
 Estación del ferrocarril Cabañas

Puerto Berrío (Calera)
 Estación del ferrocarril Calera

Puerto Berrío (Cristalina)
 Estación del ferrocarril Cristalina

Puerto Berrío (Grecia)
 Estación del ferrocarril Grecia

Puerto Berrío (Malena)

Puerto Berrío (Virginias)
 Virginias station
 Hotel Magdalena. Batallón del ejército

Puerto Nare (La Magdalena)
 Argelia station
 Estación del ferrocarril Nápoles
 Estación del ferrocarril Puerto Nare

Puerto Nare (La Sierra)
 La Sierra station

Puerto Triunfo

Rionegro
 Sector antiguo de la ciudad. Sector histórico sin delimitar

Sabaneta
 House where Dr. José Félix Restrepo was born
 Sabaneta station

San Roque

San Roque (Providencia)
 Estación del ferrocarril Providencia

San Roque (San José Nuestra Señora)
 Estación del ferrocarril San José

Santa Bárbara (La Pintada)
 Estación del ferrocarril La Pintada

Santa Fe de Antioquia (Olaya)

Santo Domingo
 House where Tomas Carrasquilla was born. Plaza principal calle 13 14–44

Santo Domingo (Botero)
 Estación del ferrocarril Botero

Santo Domingo (Santiago)
 Estación del ferrocarril Porce
 Estación del ferrocarril Santiago
 Estación del ferrocarril Santo Domingo

Santo Domingo (Porcecito)
 Estación del ferrocarril Porcecito

Sonsón
 Estación del ferrocarril La Miel

Tarso
 Estación del ferrocarril Tarso

Titiribí
 Circo teatro Girardot. Carrera Santander 21–60

Venecia
 Estación del ferrocarril San Julián
 Estación del ferrocarril Venecia

Venecia (Bolombolo)
 Estación del ferrocarril Tulio Ospina
 Estación del ferrocarril Bolombolo

Yolombó
 Estación del ferrocarril Sofía

Antioquia – Córdoba
San Jerónimo – Ituango – Dabeiba – Peque – Ayapel – Montelíbano
 Parque nacional natural Paramillo

Atlántico

Baranquilla

Bogotá D.C.

Bolívar

Calamar
 Calamar railway station

Cartagena

Cartagena (tierra bomba)
 Hospital San Lázaro. Isla de tierrabomba

Mompox

Morales
 Templo parroquial de San Sebastián. Ley 503 18-vi-2000 (declara)

San Juan Nepomuceno
 Santuario de fauna y flora Los Colorados. Resolución 002 del 12-iii-1982 (propone)

Simiti
 Templo doctrinero de San Antonio de Padua. Capilla doctrinera. Plaza principal esquina nororiental. Decreto 1930 24-ix-1993 (declara)

Boyacá

Belén de Cerinza
 Capilla doctrinera. Resolución 002 12-iii-1982 (propone)

Betéitiva
 Capilla doctrinera. Resolución 002 12-iii-1982 (propone)

Chiquinquirá

 Estación de Chiquinquirá. Estación del ferrocarril. Decreto 3053 19-xii-1990 (declara)
 Estación del ferrocarril el fical

Chíquiza
 Capilla doctrinera de San Isidro de Chiquiza. Resolución 002 12-iii-1982 (propone)

Chivatá
 Templo parroquial. Resolución 041 31-vii-1990 (propone)

Corrales
 Casa donde murió el general Juan José Reyes Patria, hero of the Battle of Gámeza

Cucaitá
 Capilla doctrinera. Templo de indios de Cucaita. Resolución 002 12-iii-1982 (propone)

Cuítiva
 Capilla doctrinera. Resolución 002 12-iii-1982 (propone)

Duitama
 Estación del ferrocarril Duitama
 Museo de Arte Religioso. Antigua casa de la hacienda San Rafael. Resolución 004 25-ix-1985 (propone)

Duitama (Bonza)
 Antigua casa de hacienda. Despensa de Bonza. Despensa del Ejército Nacional. Ruta de la campaña libertadora. Resolución 041 31-vii-1990 (propone)

Duitama (Surba y Bonza)
 Estación del ferrocarril Bonza

Iza
 Poblado de Iza. Resolución 0617 11-iv-2002 (declara)

Mongua – Socha – Tasco – Jericó – Pisba
 Parque nacional natural Pisba. Resolución 002 del 12-iii-1982 (propone)

Mongui

Motavita
 Capilla doctrinera. Resolución 002 12-iii-1982 (propone)

Nobsa (Belencito)
 Estación del ferrocarril Belencito

Oicatá
 Capilla doctrinera. Carrera 3 entre calle 4 calle 5. Resolución 002 12-iii-1982 (propone)
 Estación del ferrocarril Oicatá

Paipa
 Casa de la hacienda El Salitre. Actual hotel. Decreto 290 24-ii-1975 (declara)
 Casa Vargas. Museo Casa Vargas. Casa hacienda Vargas. Resolución 041 31-vii-1990 (propone)
 Casa Varguitas. Hospital de sangre. Ruta de la campana libertadora. Resolución 041 31-vii-1990 (propone)
 Cerro Bolívar. Ruta de la campaña libertadora. Resolución 041 31-vii-1990 (propone)
 Estación del ferrocarril Paipa
 Estación del ferrocarril Soconsuca

Paipa (Pantano de Vargas)

 Cerro el Cangrejo. Ruta de la campaña libertadora. Decreto 1744 1-ix-1975 (declara)
 Cerro el Picacho. Cerro de la guerra. Ruta de la campaña libertadora. Resolución 041 31-vii-1990 (propone)
 Pantano Vargas – ruta libertadora. Monumento a los Lanceros del Pantano de Vargas, y reserva nacional el terreno alrededor de 1 km del monumento. Decreto 1744 1-ix-1975 (declara)

Paya
 Trincheron de Paya. Reducto de San Carlos. Fuerte de San Genis. Ruta de la campaña libertadora. Resolución 041 31-vii-1990 (propone)

Ráquira (La Candelaria)
 Convento del desierto de La Candelaria. Desierto de La Candelaria. Resolución 0789 31-vii-1998 (declara)

Saboyá
 Estación del ferrocarril Saboyá

Saboyá (Garavito)
 Estación del ferrocarril Garavito

Sáchica
 Capilla doctrinera. Iglesia doctrinera

Samacá
 Estación del ferrocarril Samacá
 Estación del ferrocarril Tierra negra
 Ferrería de Samacá. Vestigios de la antigua ferrería

Siachoque
 Capilla doctrinera. Resolución 002 12-iii-1982 (propone)

Socha (Socha viejo)
 Iglesia de Socha viejo. Antigua iglesia. Decreto 268 12-ii-1980 (declara)

Sogamoso
 Estación del ferrocarril Sogamoso
 Teatro Sogamoso. Calle 12 esquina carrera 9. Decreto 2011 5-xi-1996 (declara)

Sora
 Capilla doctrinera. Resolución 002 12-iii-1982 (propone)

Sotaquirá
 Estación del ferrocarril Sotaquirá

Sutamarchán

 Convento del Santo Ecce Homo. Vía Villa de Leyva – Santa Sofía. Resolución 0789 31-vii-1998 (declara)

Tasco
 Antigua casa de hacienda. Aposentos de Tasco. Vereda Santa Bárbara. Resolución 041 31-vii-1990 (propone)

Tibasosa
 Estación del ferrocarril Tibasosa

Tipacoque
 Casa colonial de la hacienda Tipacoque. Decreto 390 17-iii-1970 (declara)

Toca
 Venta de la villana. Ruta de la campana libertadora. Resolución 041 31-vii-1990 (propone)

Tópaga

Tunja

Tunja – Arcabuco – Villa de Leyva
 Santuario de fauna y flora Iguaque. Resolución 002 del 12-iii-1982 (propone)

Tunja (Puente de Boyacá)

 Puente de Boyacá

Turmequé
 Un sector del municipio. Sector histórico delimitado. Decreto 1940 29-viii-1989 (declara)

Tuta
 Capilla iglesia doctrinera. Resolución 002 12-iii-1982 (propone)
 Estación del ferrocarril Tuta

Ventaquemada

Villa de Leyva

 Casa donde murió el precursor de la independencia y traductor de los Derechos del hombre, Antonio Nariño. Museo Antonio Nariño. Carrera 9 10–25. Ley 81 26-ix-1961 (declara)
 Sector antiguo de la ciudad. Sector histórico delimitado. Centro histórico. Reglamentación. Decreto 3641 17-xii-1954 (declara)

Boyacá – Arauca – Casanare
(Chita – El Cocuy – El Espino – Chiscas – Tame – San Lope – Samaca)
 El Cocuy National Natural Park. Resolución 002 del 12-iii-1982 (propone)

Caldas

Caquetá

Casanare

Cauca

Belalcázar (Avirama)
 Chapel Páez. Iglesia Avirama. Resolución 0752 31-vii-1998 (declara)

Buenos Aires
 Estación del ferrocarril El Hato

Buenos Aires (San Francisco)
 Estación del ferrocarril San Francisco

Cajibío
 Estación del ferrocarril Cajibío

Caloto
 Casa colonial donde se alojó el Libertador. Plaza principal, costado oriental. Ley 18 30-xii-1972 (declara)
 Santuario donde se venera la imagen de la niña María. Parroquia de San Estéban. Plaza principal. Ley 18 30-xii-1972 (declara)

Chinas
 Chapel Páez

Cohetando
 Chapel Páez

El Tambo
 Munchique National Natural Park

Inzá (Calderas)
 Chapel Páez

Inzá (Páez)

 Parque Arqueológico de Tierradentro. Sierras de la cordillera Central que llegan hasta el valle de San Agustín. Decreto 774 del 26-iv-1993 (declara). Inscrito en la lista de patrimonio mundial

Inzá San Andrés de Pisimbala
 Capilla Páez. Capilla doctrinera. Resolución 002 12-iii-1982 (propone)

Inzá (Santa Rosa)
 Chapel Páez

Gorgona Island

 Parque Nacional Natural Isla Gorgona

Lame
 Capilla Páez. Capilla doctrinera de lame

Morales
 Estación del ferrocarril Morales

Morales (Matarredondo)
 Estación del ferrocarril matarredondo

Páez Belalcázar Suin
 Capilla Páez. Iglesia de Suin

Piendamó
 Piendamo station

Piendamó (Corrales)
 Estación del ferrocarril corrales

Popayán

Popayán (Yanaconas)
 Iglesia principal. Templo principal. Templo doctrinero de yanaconas. Carrera 6, vía al oriente. Resolución 0789 31-vii-1998 (declara)

Santander de Quilichao (Dominguillo)
 Capilla de Dominguillo. Capilla de Santa Bárbara. Decreto 2860 26-xi-1984 (declara)
 Casa de hacienda Cuprecia. Decreto 763 25-iv-1996 (declara)
 Casa de hacienda Japio. En las estribaciones de la Cordillera Central. Decreto 763 25-iv-1996 (declara)
 Estación del ferrocarril Santander de Quilichao

Suárez
 Estación del ferrocarril Suárez

Suárez (Gelima La Toma)
 Estación del ferrocarril Gelima

Talaga
 Capilla Páez. Capilla doctrinera. Resolución 002 12-iii-1982 (propone)

Togoima
 Capilla Páez. Capilla doctrinera. Resolución 002 12-iii-1982 (propone)

Cauca – Huila
(Popayán – Puracé – San Sebastián – Sotara – La Argentina – La Plata – San José de Isnos – Saladoblanco – San Agustín)
 Parque Nacional Natural Puracé. Resolución 002 del 12-iii-1982 (propone)

Cauca – Huila – Tolima.
 Nevado del Huila National Natural Park. Resolución 002 del 12-iii-1982 (propone)

Cesar

Chocó
 Parque nacional natural Ensenada de Utría. Resolución 020 del 17-xi-1992 (propone)

Quibdó
 Patrimonio arquitectónico. Conjunto de inmuebles de arquitectura republicana. Edificios republicanos. Resolución 0793 31-vii-1998 (declara)

Tadó
 Iglesia de Tadó. Iglesia San José. Calle 1 carreras 18 a 20. Resolución 0795 31-vii-1998 (declara)

Chocó – Antioquia
(Riosucio – Turbo)
 Los Katíos National Park – Declared a UNESCO World Heritage Site.

Chocó – Risaralda – Valle del Cauca
San José del Palmar – Puerto Rico – El Águila
 Parque nacional natural Tatamá, Resolución 020 del 17-xi-1992 (propone)

Córdoba

Cundinamarca

Albán

Anapoima
 Estación del ferrocarril Anapoima

Anapoima y San Antonio
 Estación del ferrocarril San Antonio

Anolaima
 Estación del ferrocarril Petaluma

Anolaima y La Florida
 Estación del ferrocarril La Florida

Apulo
 Estación del ferrocarril Apulo

Beltrán
 Iglesia de Nuestra Señora de la Canoa. Resolución 1794 15-xii-2000 (declara)

Bojacá

Cachipay
 Estación del ferrocarril Cachipay

Cajicá
 Casa de la hacienda la fagua cavalier y su inmediato terreno perimetral. actual sede de la pasteurizadora la alqueria. Kilómetro 4 vía a Tabio. Resolución 007 30-vi-1975 (propone)
 Estación del ferrocarril Cajicá. Calle 2 parque la estación

Caparrapí
 Estación del ferrocarril Cambras

Caparrapí y Córdoba
 Estación del ferrocarril Córdoba

Caparrapí y El Dindal
 Estación del ferrocarril El Dindal

Chía

Chocontá

 Estación de Chocontá. Estación del ferrocarril. Carrera 8 calle 11. Decreto 746 24-iv-1996 (declara)

Cota
 Casa de la hacienda el noviciado y su inmediato terreno perimetral. Actual sede social de la Universidad de los Andes. Resolución 007 30-vi-1975 (propone)

Facatativá

Facatativá – Zipacon – Anolaima – Cachipay – La Mesa – Anapoima – Apulo – Tocaima – Girardot
 Corredor férreo Facatativá-Girardot. Resolución 0800 31-vii-1998 (declara)

Funza

Fúquene

Fusagasugá
 Quinta Coburgo. Decreto 602 26-iii-1996 (declara)

Gachancipá
 Estación de Gachancipá. Estación del ferrocarril. Decreto 746 24-iv-1996 (declara)
 Estación del ferrocarril Rabanal

Girardot

Guachetá
 Estación del ferrocarril Guachetá

Guaduas
 Sector antiguo de la ciudad. sector histórico sin delimitar. Ley 163 30-xii-1959 (declara)

Guaduas y Guaduero
 Estación del ferrocarril guaduero

Guasca

 Capilla de Siecha. Decreto 604 4-iii-1991 (declara)
 Casa de la hacienda de Siecha y su inmediato terreno perimetral. Resolución 007 30-vi-1975 (propone)

La Calera
 Capilla interior de la actual Casa de Gobierno. Decreto 2857 26-xi-1984 (declara)

La Mesa

La Mesa (La Esperanza)
 Estación del ferrocarril La Esperanza

La Mesa (San Javier)
 Estación del ferrocarril Margaritas

La Mesa (San Joaquín)
 Estación del ferrocarril San Joaquín

Lenguazaque
 Estación del ferrocarril El Rhur
 Estación del ferrocarril Lenguazaque

Madrid

Mosquera

 Casa de la hacienda San Jorge y su inmediato terreno perimetral. Carretera a la mesa. Resolución 007 30-vi-1975 (propone)
 Estación del ferrocarril Mosquera

Nemocón
 Casa de la hacienda Casablanca Nieto y su inmediato terreno perimetral. Resolución 007 30-vi-1975 (propone)
 Estación del ferrocarril Nemocón

Nimaima (Tobia)
 Estación del ferrocarril Tobia

Pacho
 Ferrería de Pacho. Vestigios de la antigua ferrería

Puerto Salgar
 Estación del ferrocarril Brisas

Puerto Salgar (Colorados)

Ricaurte
 Antigua hacienda Peñalisa – casa y capilla. Resolución 1797 15-xii-2000 (declara)

San Juan de Río Seco (Cambao)
 Estación del ferrocarril Cambao

Sasaima
 Estación del ferrocarril Sasaima

Sasaima (La Victoria)
 Estación del ferrocarril La Victoria

Sesquilé
 Casa de la hacienda Chaleche y su inmediato terreno perimetral, Resolución 007 30-vi-1975 (propone)
 Estación del ferrocarril Sesquilé – Vereda Boitiva

Sibaté
 Casa de la hacienda San Benito y su inmediato terreno perimetral. Resolución 007 30-vi-1975 (propone)

Silvania
 Parque arqueológico. Dentro de la hacienda Tequendama. Resolución 001-1971 (propone)

Simijaca
 Casa de la hacienda aposentos y su inmediato terreno perimetral. Resolución 007 30-vi-1975 (propone)
 Estación del ferrocarril Simijaca

Soacha

Sopó
 Casa de la hacienda Hato Grande y su inmediato terreno perimetral. Vía Sopó kilómetro 35, Resolución 007 30-vi-1975 (propone)
 Casa de la hacienda Casablanca Ortiz y su inmediato terreno perimetral. Resolución 007 30-vi-1975 (propone)
 Casa de la hacienda el castillo, hoy herradura y su inmediato terreno perimetral. Resolución 007 30-vi-1975 (propone)
 Conjunto arquitectónico de la iglesia del divino salvador y su casa cural, incluida la colección denominada "los ángeles de sopo". Decreto 3054 19-xii-1990 (declara)

Sopó (Briceño)
 Estación del ferrocarril Briceño

Subachoque
 Casa de la hacienda Pradera y su inmediato terreno perimetral. Resolución 007 30-vi-1975 (propone)
 Hornos y torres de la ferrería de la pradera

Suesca

Susa
 Susa station

Sutatausa
 Iglesia colonial, plaza y capillas Posas. Decreto 192 31-i-1980 (declara)

Tabio
 Capilla doctrinera. Ermita de Santa Bárbara. Carretera a banos termales. Resolución 002 12-iii-1982 (propone)

Tena
 Hacienda de Tena y su conjunto: casa de huéspedes, biblioteca, casa principal, administración, capilla y casa comercial. Entrada principal al pueblo en la vereda El Rosario. Resolución 001a-1971 (propone)

Tenjo

Tocaima

Tocancipá
 Estación de Tocancipá. Estación del ferrocarril. Decreto 746 24-iv-1996 (declara)

Útica
 Estación del ferrocarril Útica

Villapinzón
 Estación del ferrocarril La Nevera
 Estación del ferrocarril Villapinzón

Villeta

Zipacón

Zipacón (El Ocaso)
 Estación del ferrocarril El Ocaso

Zipacon (la capilla)
 Estación del ferrocarril La Capilla

Zipaquirá

Zipaquirá – Barandillas – Las Fuentes – El Tunal
 Zona localizada en el municipio de Zipaquirá valle del abra veredas de barandillas, las fuentes y el tunal. Resolución 004 del 10-x-1972 (propone)

Cundinamarca – Meta
(Fómeque – Quetame – La Calera – Guasca – Junín – Gachalá – El Calvario – Restrepo)
 Chingaza National Natural Park

Guainia
 Reserva Natural Puinawai

San Felipe
 Fuerte de San Felipe de Rionegro o de San Carlos

Guaviare
 Reserva nacional natural Nukak

Huila

Acevedo
 Parque nacional natural Cueva de los Guácharos. Vertiente occidental de la cordillera Oriental sur este del Huila. Resolución 020 del 17-xi-1992 (propone)

Acevedo – Isnos – La Argentina – La Plata – Porapa – Pitalito – Saladoblanco – San Agustín – Tarqui – Timaná

 San Agustín Archaeological Park. Sierras de la cordillera Central que llegan hasta el valle de San Agustín en el alto Magdalena. Decreto 774 del 26-iv-1993 (declara); a World Heritage Site

Gigante
 Casa donde nació Ismael Perdomo. Hostal. Calle 3 4–45. Decreto 222 21-ii-1972 (declara)
 Iglesia de San Antonio. Templo donde fue bautizado monseñor Ismael Perdomo. Decreto 222 21-ii-1972 (declara)

Neiva
 Capilla de la concepción. Iglesia de la concepción. Resolución 002 12-iii-1982 (propone)
 Estación del ferrocarril Neiva

Neiva (Fortalecillas)
 Estación del ferrocarril Fortalecillas

Villavieja
 Capilla Santa Bárbara. Plaza principal, costado sur. Resolución 002 06-iv-1981 (propone)
 Estación del ferrocarril Villavieja

Villavieja (Golondrinas)
 Estación del ferrocarril Golondrinas

Villavieja (Potosí)
 Estación del ferrocarril Potosí

Yaguara
 Casa donde nació y vivió Adriano Perdomo Trujillo fundador de la Cruz Roja. Plaza principal, esquina nororiental. Ley 4 9-i-1986 (declara)

La Guajira
 Santuario de fauna y flora Los Flamencos. Resolución 002 del 12-iii-1982 (propone)

El Molino
 Ermita de San Lucas. Iglesia colonial del molino. Resolución 008 12-xi-1992 (propone)

Riohacha
 Tumba de José Prudencio Padilla. Catedral de Nuestra Señora de los Remedios. Calle 2 entre carrera 7 carrera 8. ley 6 20-viii-1948 (declara)

Uribia
 Parque nacional natural Macuira. Resolución 002 del 12-iii-1982 (propone)

La Guajira – Magdalena – Cesar
 Parque nacional natural Sierra Nevada de Santa Marta – Decreto 1192 del 26-v-1977 (declara)

Magdalena

Aracataca

 Casa natal del escritor Gabriel García Márquez y el ámbito cultural de la población. Decreto 480 13-iii-1996 (declara)
 Estación del ferrocarril Aracataca

Ciénaga

Ciénaga (Guamachito)
 Estación del ferrocarril Guamachito

Ciénaga (Orihueca)
 Estación del ferrocarril Oricueta

Ciénaga (Riofrío)
 Estación del ferrocarril Riofrio

Ciénaga (Sevilla)
 Estación del ferrocarril Sevilla

Fundación
 Estación del ferrocarril Algarrobo
 Estación del ferrocarril Fundación
 Estación del ferrocarril Lleras

Santa Marta

Santa Marta (Bonda)
 Estación del ferrocarril Bonda

Santa Marta (Buritaca)

 Parque arqueológico de Teyuna – Ciudad Perdida. Parque arqueológico de ciudad perdida. Sierra Nevada de Santa Marta. Resolución 037 del 31-x-1995 (propone)
 Tayrona National Natural Park. Resolución 002 del 12-iii-1982 (propone)

Santa Marta (Gaira)
 Estación del ferrocarril Gaira

Santa Marta (Mamatoco)
 Capilla de San Jerónimo. Iglesia de Mamatoco. Plaza principal de Mamatoco, costado oriental. Plaza de San Aragón. Resolución 015 13-xi-1992 (propone)

Santa Marta (Taganga)
 Iglesia de San Francisco de Asís. Church of Taganga. Plaza de San Francisco. Carrera 2a entre calle 8 y calle 9. Decreto 481 13-iii-1996 (declara)

Sitio Nuevo
 Parque nacional natural isla de salamanca. Resolución 002 del 12-iii-1982 (propone)

Tenerife
 Templo parroquial de San Sebastián de Tenerife y su colección de bienes muebles. Plaza principal. Decreto 1912 2-xi-1995 (declara)

Meta
 Parque nacional natural Tinigua. Resolución 020 del 17-xi-1992 (propone)

San Juan de Arama
 Parque nacional natural Sierra de la Macarena. Ley 163 del 30-xii-1959 art.5 (declara)

Meta – Caquetá
(San Juan de Arama – Guacamayas – San Vicente del Caguán)
 Parque nacional natural Cordillera de los Picachos. Resolución 002 del 12-iii-1982 (propone)

Nariño

Arboleda
 Reserva arqueológica de Berruecos (toda la región). Por el este limita con San José en una extensión de 10.255 km; norte: municipio de la unión en una extensión de 3.605 km; oeste: municipio de San Lorenzo en una extensión de 8.249 km sur: río Juanambu en una extensión de 8.575 km. Área total 139 km². Decreto 2666 del 31-xii-1971 (declara)

Consaca (Bombona)
 Hacienda bombona. Resolución 002 12-iii-1982 (propone)

Ipiales (Las Lajas)
 Santuario nacional de Las Lajas. Iglesia de Las Lajas

Mosquera – El Charco – Olaya Herrera
 Parque nacional natural Sanquianga. Bahía Sanquianga en el litoral pacífico

Pasto

Pupiales
 Reserva arqueológica Pupiales (toda la región incluyendo sus corregimientos, caseríos e inspecciones de policía)

San Andrés
 Capilla misionera

San Francisco
 Capilla misionera

Sandona
 Iglesia. Basílica de Nuestra Señora del Rosario. Plaza principal esquina

Norte de Santander
 Área natural única Los Estoraques. Resolución 002 del 12-iii-1982 (propone)
 Parque nacional natural Catatumbo Bari. Río Catatumbo. Resolución 020 del 17-xi-1992 (propone)

Bochalema
 Estación del ferrocarril Bochalema. Escuela Penaviva. km 37 vía Bochalema
 Estación del ferrocarril Diamante

Bochalema (la donjuana)
 Estación del ferrocarril la donjuana. Campamento ministerio de obras públicas

Chitaga
 Puente Real

Cúcuta

Cúcuta (alto viento)
 Estación del ferrocarril alto viento

Cúcuta (El Salado)
 Estación del ferrocarril El Salado. Escuela El Salado. Avenida 6 19–40 carrera 50

Cúcuta (La Jarra)
 Estación del ferrocarril La Jarra

Cúcuta (Puerto Santander)
 Estación del ferrocarril Puerto Santander. Plaza de mercado

Ocaña

Pamplona

Pamplonita
 Iglesia de Nuestra Señora del Rosario. Decreto 1914 2-xi-1995 (declara)

Toledo
 Parque nacional natural Tama. Resolución 002 del 12-iii-1982 (propone)

Villa del Rosario

Putumayo
 Parque nacional natural La Playa

Quindío

Armenia
 Armenia railway station. Carrera 18 y carrera 19 calle 26
 Ortega Díaz railway station
 Plaza de mercado. Calle 15 calle 16 calle 17 carrera 16 carrera 17 carrera 18

La Tebaida
 La Tebaida railway station
 Marabelis railway station

Montenegro
 Montenegro railway station

Quimbaya
 Carmelitas railway station
 Quimbaya railway station

Risaralda

Dosquebradas
 Estación del ferrocarril Dosquebradas

La Virginia
 Estación del ferrocarril Otún

Pereira

Pereira y Betulia
 Estación del ferrocarril Betulia

Pereira (La Selva)
 La Selva station

Pereira (Morelia)
 Estación del ferrocarril Morelia

Pereira (Puerto Caldas)
 Estación del ferrocarril Puerto Caldas

Pereira (San Joaquín)
 San Joaquín station

Santa Rosa de Cabal
 Guayabito station
 Gutiérrez station

Santa rosa de cabal (la capilla)
 Estación del ferrocarril la capilla
 Estación del ferrocarril Santa Rosa de Cabal
 Seminario menor la apostólica. Escuela apostólica. Carrera 7 13–29 alto del rosario

San Andrés y Providencia

Providencia
 Escuela de María Inmaculada. Freetown

San Andrés (La Loma)
 Iglesia bautista de La Loma. Iglesia bautista Mission Hill

San Andrés – Providencia y Santa Catalina
 Fuerte de la libertad

Santander

Barichara
 Sector antiguo de la ciudad. Sector histórico delimitado. Centro histórico. El sector antiguo parte de la calle 4 con cra 10, hacia el oriente hasta la calle 8, por esta hacia el sur hasta la cra 8, sigue al oriente hasta calle 9, nuevamente al sur hasta cra. 6, luego al occidente hasta calle 8, al sur hasta cra 5, de este punto en sentido sur-occidental hasta cra 4 con calle 7, al sur hasta cra 3, al occidente hasta calle 5, al sur hasta cra 2, al occidente hasta calle 4, al norte hasta cra 3, al occidente hasta calle 3, al norte hasta cra 5, al occidente hasta calle 2, al norte hasta cra 7, al oriente hasta calle 3, al norte hasta cra 9 y en diagonal hacia el nor-oriente hasta encontrar el sitio de partida. Decreto 1654 del 3-viii-1978 (declara)

Barichara y Guane
 Camino real de Barichara a Guane. Resolución 0790 31-vii-1998 (declara)
 Iglesia parroquial santuario de Santa Lucía. Templo doctrinero. Plaza principal. Resolución 0795 31-vii-1998 (declara)

Barrancabermeja
 Estación del ferrocarril Barrancabermeja
 Estación del ferrocarril Cuatrobocas
 Estación del ferrocarril Penjamo

Bucaramanga

Bucaramanga (Estación Madrid)
 Estación del ferrocarril café Madrid

Cimitarra
 Estación del ferrocarril Carare
 Estación del ferrocarril San Juan

Cimitarra (Puerto Olaya)
 Estación del ferrocarril Puerto Olaya

Confines
 Iglesia de San Cayetano. Templo. Decreto 1192 del 26-v-1977 (declara)

Girón

 Estación del ferrocarril Palmas
 Sector antiguo de la ciudad. Sector histórico delimitado. Decreto 264 del 12-ii-1963 (declara)

Lebrija
 Estación del ferrocarril puerto santos

Lebrija (Chuspas)
 Estación del ferrocarril Chuspas

Lebrija (Conchal)
 Estación del ferrocarril Conchal

Lebrija (Vanegas)
 Estación del ferrocarril Vanegas

Matanza
 Iglesia de Nuestra Señora de las mercedes. Plaza principal. Resolución 659 2-v- 2001 (declara)

Puente Nacional
 Estación de ferrocarril Límites
 Estación del ferrocarril Guayabo

Puente Nacional (Providencia)
 Estación del ferrocarril Providencia
 Estación del ferrocarril Puente Nacional

Puente Nacional (Los Robles)
 Estación del ferrocarril Los Robles

Puerto Wilches

Puerto Wilches (puente Sogamoso)
 Sogamoso railway station

Rionegro
 Lebrija railway station

Sabana de Torres

Sabana de Torres (Provincia)
 Provincia railway station
 Sabana de Torres railway station

Sabana de Torres (Sabaneta)
 Sabaneta railway station

San Gil
 Colegio universitario San José y San Pedro de alcántara de Guanenta. Casona de la Normal. Carrera 10 11–27. Decreto 2862 del 26-xi-1984 (declara)
 Sector antiguo de la ciudad. Sector histórico sin delimitar. Decreto 264 del 12-ii-1963 (declara)

Simacota
 Opón railway station
 Pulpapel railway station

Simacota (Viscaina alta)
 Viscaina railway station

Socorro

Vélez
 Edificio colonial donde funciona el colegio universitario. Antiguo convento de San Francisco de Vélez
 Estación del ferrocarril Montoyas

Sucre

San Benito Abad
 Basílica menor del Señor de Los Milagros

Tolima

Alvarado, Caldas station
 Caldas railway station

Ambalema

Armero (Guayabal)
 Armero railway station
 San Felipe railway station

Coello (Gualanday)
 Gualanday railway station

Coyaima
 Coyaima railway station

Coyaima (Castilla)
 Castilla railway station

Espinal
 Espinal railway station
 Santa Ana railway station

El Espinal (Chicoral)
 Chicoral railway station

Guamo
 Guamo railway station

Honda

Ibagué

Ibagué (Buenos Aires)
 Estación del ferrocarril Buenos Aires

Ibagué (Picalena)
 Estación del ferrocarril picalena

Mariquita
 Estación del ferrocarril Mariquita
 Sector antiguo de la ciudad. Sector histórico sin delimitar

Natagaima

Piedras (doima)
 Estación del ferrocarril Doima

Saldaña
 Estación del ferrocarril Saldaña

Venadillo (palmarrosa)
 Palmarrosa railway station

Tolima – Valle

(Flandes – Cali)
 Conjunto de antiguas locomotoras a vapor en Colombia

Valle del Cauca

Andalucía
 Andalucía railway station

Buenaventura
 Buenaventura railway station
 Pailón railway station
 Triana railway station

Buenaventura (Cisneros)
 Cisneros railway station

Buenaventura (Córdoba)
 Córdoba railway station

Buga

Bugalagrande
 Bugalagrande railway station
 La Uribe railway station

Bugalagrande (El Overo)

 Chapel of Our Lady of Conception (or El Overo Chapel)

Caicedonia
 Caicedonia railway station

Cali

Cali – Buenaventura – Dagua – Jamundí
 Parque Nacional Natural los Farallones de Cali – Resolución 002 del 12-iii-1982 (propone)

Cartago

Dagua

Dagua (El Naranjo)
 Estación del ferrocarril El Naranjo

Dagua (el palmar)
 Estación del ferrocarril El Palmar

Dagua (la ventura)
 Estación del ferrocarril Ventura

Dagua (lobo guerrero)
 Estación del ferrocarril lobo Guerrero

El Cerrito

Florida

Guacari
 Casa cural. Antigua casa de hacienda. Decreto 738 del 22-iv-1976 (declara)
 Guacari station

Jamundí
 Jamundí station

Jamundí (Guachinte)
 Guachinte station

Jamundí (Timba)
 Timba station

La Cumbre
 Bitaco station
 La Cumbre station

La Cumbre (Lomitas)
 Lomitas station

La Victoria
 La Victoria station

Obando
 Obando station

Palmira

Palmira (Amaime)
 Hacienda La Concepción

Palmira (Caucaseco)
 Caucaseco station

Palmira (Guanabanal)
 Estación del ferrocarril Guanabanal

Palmira (la manuelita)
 Estación del ferrocarril la manuelita

Pradera
 Estación del ferrocarril Pradera.

San Pedro
 Estación del ferrocarril San Pedro

Sevilla (corozal)
 Estación del ferrocarril Corozal

Toro
 Iglesia de Nuestra Señora del Carmen. Iglesia de Nuestra Señora de la Consolación

Tuluá
 Estación del ferrocarril Tuluá

Valle del Cauca – Tolima
(Tulúa – Buga – Palmira – Pradera – Chaparral – Rioblanco)
 Parque nacional natural las hermosas

Ulloa
 Estación del ferrocarril Ulloa

Yotoco
 Hatoviejo ranch house
 Garzonero ranch house

Yumbo
 Estación del ferrocarril Yumbo

Yumbo (Puerto Isaacs)
 Puerto Isaacs railway station

Zarzal
 Álvarez Salas railway station
 Zarzal railway station

Zarzal (La Paila)
 La Paila railway station

Zarzal (Vallejuelo)
 Vallejuelo railway station

Vichada
 El Tuparro National Natural Park

Colombia nation-wide
 Conjunto de las estaciones de pasajeros del ferrocarril en Colombia
 Conjunto de las antiguas ferrerías en Colombia
 Primeras pruebas de galeras de la obra Cien años de soledad, correcciones de Gabriel García Márquez

References 

 
Heritage registers in Colombia
Colombian culture
National monuments